RIE may refer to:

Reactive-ion etching, as an acronym
Rie, a Japanese given name
The Royal Infirmary of Edinburgh, the oldest voluntary hospital in Edinburgh, United Kingdom
Resources for Infant Educarers, as an acronym

See also

 RE (disambiguation)
 RI (disambiguation)
 Rye (disambiguation)
 Ree (disambiguation)
 Rhee (disambiguation)